Harold Mitchell Jr. (born June 3, 1965) is an American politician from Spartanburg. He was a Democratic member of the South Carolina House of Representatives from the 31st District, serving from 2005 to 2017.

In 2012, he pled guilty to two charges of failing to file state tax returns and was suspended from office following his indictment on felony tax charges.

He resigned from office on May 5, 2017, on the advice of his doctors.

References

Living people
1965 births
Democratic Party members of the South Carolina House of Representatives
Politicians from Spartanburg, South Carolina
African-American state legislators in South Carolina
21st-century American politicians
21st-century African-American politicians
20th-century African-American people